Norman Michael MacNeil is a Scottish songwriter and keyboardist born 20 July 1958 on the Isle of Barra, Scotland. He is best known as a former member of the group Simple Minds. 

Trained as a folk music accordionist between the ages of seven and sixteen, MacNeil discovered pop music at seventeen.

MacNeil joined Simple Minds in 1978 and left in 1990. During his time with the band he was recognised as one of their main composers. After leaving Simple Minds, he occasionally joined Simple Minds-related projects such as Fourgoodmen (along with fellow ex-Simple Minds member Derek Forbes plus Ian Henderson and Bruce Watson) and XSM (with Forbes and original Simple Minds drummer Brian McGee). He also recorded with a reformed Visage.

He released a solo album called People, Places, Things on his own record label, Mixrecords in 1997.

Equipment

During the early years of Simple Minds (the first four albums, between 1978 and 1982) MacNeil used a Farfisa organ and a "tiny wee Korg, two oscillators on it... It was a stupid sound, but it had lots of good noises on it."

In 1986, MacNeil's stage equipment included a Yamaha CP-70 piano (used as his master keyboard via MIDI), a Yamaha DX7, an Emulator II, an Oberheim OB-8, a Roland Jupiter-8 and an unspecified Kurzweil keyboard using an Apple Macintosh for program saving. He was also using an Elka accordion with MIDI capacity.

References 

1958 births
Living people
Scottish keyboardists
People from Barra